The Honda Dylan is a motor scooter manufacturer by Honda from 2002 to 2006.

Specification
Presented at the Bologna Motor Show in December 2001, the Dylan goes into production at the Honda Italia plant in Atessa the following January; is positioned within the manufacturer's range of scooters between the Honda @ and the SH. In 2006 it was replaced by the Honda PS.

The Dylan uses the same chassis of the european Honda @ and was available with two single-cylinder four-stroke engines, one of 125 and the other of 150 cm³. Engine power was transferred to the rear wheel through a centrifugal clutch equipped with a continuously variable V-belt drive. In addition, the scooter was equipped with a mixed disc-drum braking system, equipped with the CBS (Combined Brake System).

External links
https://web.archive.org/web/20080727003151/http://www.jhmc.co.uk/new_honda_motorcycles/honda_dylan_125.html

Dylan
Motor scooters